Harvest House Publishers is a Christian publishing company founded in 1974 in Irvine, California, United States, and is now located in Eugene, Oregon.  It publishes Christian fiction and non-fiction books, coming out with over 160 new books a year.

Notable authors published by Harvest House
 Richard Abanes
 John Ankerberg
 Carolyn Arends
 Kay Arthur
 Dillon Burroughs
 Linda Chaikin
 Margaret Feinberg
 Elizabeth George
 Jack W. Hayford
 Ed Hindson
 Greg Laurie
 Susan Meissner
 Don Miller
 Johnnie Moore, Jr.
 Gilbert Morris
 Henry M. Morris father of the creation science movement
 Stormie Omartian
 Ron Rhodes
 Lauren Stratford
 Bob Welch
 Lori Wick
 Jennifer Rothschild

See also
 List of companies based in Oregon

References

External links 
 

Christian publishing companies
Publishing companies established in 1974
Companies based in Eugene, Oregon
Book publishing companies based in Oregon
1974 establishments in Oregon